Ahe, Ahemaru or Omaru, is a coral atoll in the northern Tuamotu Archipelago, 14 km to the west of Manihi, in French Polynesia. Its ring shape is broken by only a single small passage into the lagoon. It has a land area of approximately 12 km2 and a lagoon area of 138 km2. , Ahe Atoll had 553 inhabitants. The only village in Ahe is Tenukupara with approximately 100 inhabitants. It is located on an island in the south side of the Atoll.

The Atoll is part of the King George Islands (Iles du Roi Georges) subgroup, which includes Ahe, Manihi, Takapoto, Takaroa and Tikei. There are several pearl farms in Ahe's lagoon.

History
The first recorded Europeans to arrive to Ahe Atoll were Dutch mariners Willem Schouten and Jacob Le Maire in 1616. Ahe was later visited by the United States Exploring Expedition, 1838–1842. Charles Wilkes called the atoll "Peacock Island" after one of the ships of the expedition. 
This atoll has sometimes suffered damage caused by cyclones.

In the late 1970s, sailor Bernard Moitessier lived on Ahe for two years.

Demographics
Population of Ahe:

Administration
Ahe Atoll belongs to the commune of Manihi, which consists of the atolls of Manihi and Ahe.

See also
Ahe Airport

References

External links

Ahe Atoll FP (EVS Islands)
Shuttle Image ISS008-E-17141 (Astronaut Photography)
Shuttle Image ISS007-E-16671 (Astronaut Photography)

Tuamotu Atolls List (Pacific Image)
TX5EG Amateur Radio DX Expedition to Ahe Atoll

Atolls of the Tuamotus